Stefano Margotti (7 March 1900 – 19 May 1981) was an Italian sports shooter. He competed at the 1936 Summer Olympics and 1948 Summer Olympics.

References

External links
 

1900 births
1981 deaths
Italian male sport shooters
Olympic shooters of Italy
Shooters at the 1936 Summer Olympics
Shooters at the 1948 Summer Olympics
Sportspeople from Turin